Blunden Shadbolt (1879–1949) was a British architect who specialised in houses in the neo-Tudor and Arts and Crafts style.

References

External links 
http://www.blundenshadbolt.co.uk/

20th-century British architects
1879 births
1949 deaths